Ri Yong-gil (born 1955) is a North Korean military officer and a vice chairman of the Central Military Commission of the Workers' Party of Korea. He is believed to have been in his 60s when appointed to his position as a general in 2013.

Career 
Ri was made a Lieutenant General in April 2002 and given command of the forward-deployed 3rd Army Corps from 2002 to 2007, and later the 5th Army Corps from 2007 to 2012.

He was promoted to Colonel General (Sangjang) and elected an alternate member of the Central Committee of the Workers' Party of Korea in 2010. He was promoted to chief of the General Staff Operations Bureau in late 2012, in charge of coordinating KPA corps commanders and reporting to the chief of General Staff and the Supreme Command.

Ri was appointed Chief of the General Staff of the Korean People's Army in August 2013 as well as promoted to general around the same time.

In early February 2016, the South Korean news agency Yonhap reported that Ri had recently been executed on charges of corruption and forming a political faction.  The unconfirmed rumour was widely circulated in mass media, but it was announced during the May 2016 Party Congress that Ri had been appointed a member of the Central Committee of the North's ruling Workers’ Party, as well as its Central Military Commission. General Ri was named an alternate member of the Politburo. As of April 2017, state media identified Ri as first deputy chief of the General Staff and director of the General Operations Bureau of the Korean People's Army. At 27 July 2018 KCNA reported that the general was again promoted to 4 star general and again Chief of the General Staff of Korean People Army, until 2019. After that he served as a party department director.

He was reelected to the Politburo following the 8th Party Congress in January 2021 as the new minister of Social Security. He was later moved to minister of Defense, joining also the State Affairs Commission in September of the same year.

On 14 April 2022, he was promoted to Vice-Marshal of the KPA by the Central Military Commission of the Workers' Party of Korea. On 1 January 2023, he was appointed as a vice chairman of the Central Military Commission, replacing Pak Jong-chon.

Sanctions 
On 22 March 2021, the Council of the European Union imposed a set of restrictive measures against Ri giving the reason for listing: "As Head of the Ministry of Social Security, Ri Yong Gil is responsible for serious human rights violations in the DPRK, in particular torture and other cruel, inhuman or degrading treatment or punishment, extrajudicial, summary or arbitrary executions and killings, enforced disappearance of persons, and arbitrary arrests or detentions, as well as widespread forced labour and sexual violence against women."

Awards and honors 
A picture of Ri shows him wearing the ribbons of all decorations awarded to him.

References

|-

|-

|-

|-

1955 births
Date of birth unknown
Living people
North Korean generals
Members of the 8th Politburo of the Workers' Party of Korea
Members of the 8th Central Committee of the Workers' Party of Korea